The Canadian Brass is a Canadian brass quintet formed in 1970 in Toronto, Ontario, by Charles Daellenbach (tuba) and Gene Watts (trombone), with horn player Graeme Page and trumpeters Stuart Laughton and Bill Phillips completing the quintet. , Daellenbach is the sole original member in the group, with the  other members being trumpeters Caleb Hudson and Fabio Brum, hornist Jeff Nelsen, and trombonist Achilles Liarmakopoulos.

The group is known for the use of humor in their live performances and an irreverent attitude that includes their signature attire of formal black suits with white running shoes. They have performed internationally and have recorded more than 130 CDs and DVDs. They have commissioned, performed, and recorded hundreds of transcriptions and original works for brass quintet. Canadian Brass has a library of more than 600 compositions and arrangements written specifically for them.

The quintet was named the "one of the most popular brass ensembles in the world" in 2015 by The Washington Post. They have appeared on all the major North American TV networks, The Tonight Show Starring Johnny Carson, CBS Sunday Morning, and Hunan TV in China.

History 
The Canadian Brass originally included "Ensemble" in its name, but in 1971, the Hamilton Philharmonic's then-music director Betty Webster suggested that the quintet should be officially named the Canadian Brass.

Canadian Brass made its American debut at the Kennedy Center in Washington, D.C. in 1975. A significant international visit was made in 1977 when they were sent to mainland China as a cultural exchange between Canada and China. The ensemble was chosen and sent on this cultural mission by then-Prime Minister Pierre Elliott Trudeau.  They are now remembered in China as the first Western musicians allowed into China after the Cultural Revolution had suppressed Western art and music.

In 1979, the Canadian Brass became the first chamber ensemble to solo the MAIN stage at Carnegie Hall. As The New York Times reported, their sold-out performance "clearly establishes the Canadian Brass as a main-stage attraction."  In addition to their heavy international touring schedule for nearly 50 years, and their extensive recording catalog, they have been on the Billboard charts in each decade of their existence, recording for RCA Records, BMG, Columbia Records, SONY, Philips Decca, Steinway Label and Opening Day Entertainment occupying virtually all the spots open to brass players. As of 2018, the Canadian Brass recordings have been released by Toronto-based Opening Day Entertainment Group (ODEG), headed by the Daellenbachs.

The first recordings the Brass created were for the CBC radio transcription service, including their very first major concert in Toronto the summer of 1971.  Record producer Eleanor Sniderman discovered the group and put the group on its first commercial LPs in 1973 and 1974, which then attracted major artist management in New York City. In 1977, the same year the Brass represented North America in the People's Republic of China, a live radio broadcast on WQXR was heard by multi-Grammy award-winning producer Jay Saks, who was impressed, and brought the group to the prestigious RCA Red Seal label. The ensemble was then scouted by CBS records, soon to be Sony, where they recorded with the Berlin Philharmonic, New York Philharmonic and Boston Symphony brass players, establishing a repertoire that is now standard for expanded brass ensembles.

When the group's former manager, Costa Pilavachi, assumed the post of "Head of A&R" at Philips Records in the Netherlands, he lured the Brass to his new label, establishing a new European presence for the group. In 1992, the Brass returned to RCA, releasing fourteen albums in eight years, including Bach's Goldberg Variations, for which the group won a German Echo award.

Stuart Laughton founded Opening Day in 1993, as a recording company specializing in Canadian performers and compositions (five JUNO nominations and a win resulted). By 2003 Laughton was seeking a partner for the heavy work load, and in talks with Chuck Daellenbach agreed to share, then relinquish control. Daellenbach extended the scope of the company, creating Opening Day Entertainment Group and entering into partnership with producer Trey Mills later that year. Mills signed over to Mary Beth Daellenbach in December, 2007. Opening Day Entertainment Group remains an independent recording label now directed by Mary Beth Daellenbach. As of 2014 ODEG has released over 70 CDs for artists in a variety of genres.

Members

Current
 Charles Daellenbach – tuba 
 Jeff Nelsen – French horn 
 Fabio Brum – trumpet 
 Achilles Liarmakopoulos – trombone, euphonium 
 Caleb Hudson – trumpet, piccolo trumpet

Past

 Stuart Laughton – trumpet 
 Graeme Page – french horn 
 Bill Phillips – trumpet 
 Gene Watts – trombone, euphonium 
 Ronald Romm – trumpet, piccolo trumpet 
 Martin Hackleman – French horn 
 Fred Mills – trumpet, piccolo trumpet 
 David Ohanian – french horn 
 Jens Lindemann – trumpet, piccolo trumpet 
 Christopher Cooper – French horn 
 Ryan Anthony – trumpet, piccolo trumpet  
 Joe Burgstaller – trumpet, piccolo trumpet 
 Jeroen Berwaerts – trumpet 
 Bernhard Scully – french horn 
 Charles Lazarus – trumpet 
 Justin Emerich  – trumpet 
 Brandon Ridenour – trumpet ("Trumpet Dream Team", 2006–2010; 2009–2013; 2019-2022)
 Chris Coletti  – trumpet 
 Manon Lafrance – trumpet 
 Eric Reed – French horn 
 Keith Dyrda – trombone, euphonium

Timeline

Awards and honours
Their awards range from three honorary doctorates to Grammy, Canadian Juno and German Echo recording awards.

Founding member Daellenbach was appointed to the Order of Canada, the country's highest civilian honour, in 2014. In accepting this appointment, he said, "not only do I accept this appointment for my family and myself, but on behalf of the incredible colleagues that accompanied me on this unbelievable musical journey... firstly Watts, Mills, Romm, Page and Ohanian and now the '2nd generation' colleagues of today!"

Their album Canadiana was a Juno Award nominee for Instrumental Album of the Year at the Juno Awards of 2023.

Discography
 Canadian Brass (CBC, 1971)
 Rag-Ma-Tazz (CBC, 1973)
 Make We Joy – with Festival Singers of Canada (CBC, 1973)
 Royal Fanfare (Vanguard, 1973)
 Canadian Brass in Paris (Boot, 1974)
 Canadian Brass (Boot, 1974)
 Canadian Brass: Pachelbel to Joplin (Welk Group, 1974) 
 Plays/Joue Rags (Radio Canada 1974)
 Rag-Ma-Tazz (Vanguard, 1975)
 Pucker & Valve Society Band (Umbrella, 1975) 
 Joyful Sounds (CBC, 1976)
 National Arts Center Orchestra with the Canadian Brass (CBC, 1976)
 Canadian Brass (Umbrella, 1977)
 Canadian Brass Encore (CBC, 1977)
 Unexplored Territory (CBC, 1977)
 Toccata, Fugues & Other Diversions (Umbrella,1977)
 Bells & Brass (Good Day, 1978)
 Mostly Fats: The Canadian Brass Plays Fats Waller's Greatest Hits (RCA, 1979)
 Unexplored Territory (CBC, 1978)
 The Pachelbel Canon: The Canadian Brass Plays Great Baroque Music (RCA, 1980)
 A Touch of Brass (CBC, 1980)
 The Village Band: A Nostalgic Recollection (RCA, 1980)
 Christmas with the Canadian Brass and the Great Organ of St. Patrick's Cathedral (RCA, 1981)
 High, Bright, Light and Clear: The Glory of Baroque Brass (RCA, 1983)
 Champions (CBS, 1983)
 A Canadian Brass Christmas (CBS, 1985)
 Live! (CBS, 1985)
 Brass & Bells at Christmas (Salvation Army, 1985)
 The Four Seasons (CBS, 1986)
 The Canadian Brass Plays George Gershwin (RCA Victor, 1987)
 Basin Street (FM, 1987)
 Pachelbel to Joplin (Vanguard, 1987)
 Art of the Fugue (CBS, 1988)
 The Mozart Album (CBS, 1988)
 Gabrieli/Monteverdi: Antiphonal Music (CBS, 1989)
 Brass in Berlin (CBS, 1984)
 The Christmas Album (Philips, 1990)
 English Renaissance Music (CBS, 1990)
 Red, White & Brass: Made in the USA (Philips, 1991)
 The Essential Canadian Brass (Philips, 1991)
 Red Hot Jazz: The Dixieland Album (Philips, 1993)
 Wagner for Brass (Philips, 1993)
 Rejoice! with Brass and Voice (Canticum Novum 1993)
 Gabrieli for Brass (Philips, 1994)
 Brass On Broadway (Philips, 1994)
 Noel (RCA Victor, 1994)
 Bolero and Other Classical Blockbusters (RCA Victor, 1995)
 Swingtime! (RCA Victor, 1995)
 Go for Baroque! (RCA Victor, 1995)
 Ragtime! (RCA Victor/BMG, 1995)
 Brass Busters! (RCA Victor/BMG, 1995)
 Brass Theater II (CORE, 1996)
 Plays Bernstein (RCA Victor, 1997)
 A Christmas Experiment (RCA Victor, 1997)
 All You Need Is Love (RCA Victor/BMG, 1998)
 Take the A Train (BMG, 1999)
 Goldberg Variations (RCA Victor, 2000)
 Amazing Brass (Opening Day, 2002)
 Sweet Songs of Christmas (Opening Day, 2002) 
 Sacred Brass (BMG, 2002)
 A Holiday Tradition (True North, 2003)
 Magic Horn (Opening Day, 2004)
 Joyful Sounds – with organ and choir (Opening Day, 2005) 
 Concert Band Essentials (Opening Day, 2007)
 Christmas Tradition (Opening Day, 2007)
 High Society (Opening Day, 2005)
 Wedding Essentials (Opening Day, 2006)
 People of Faith (Opening Day 2006) – with Elmer Iseler Singers
 Echo: Glory of Gabrieli (Opening Day ,2009) 
 A Christmas Gloria (Mormon Tabernacle Choir 2007)
 Die Kunst Der Fuge (Sony, 2007)
 Jazz Roots (Opening Day 2008)
 Manhattan Music (Opening Day, 2008)
 Bach (Opening Day, 2008)
 Legends (Opening Day, 2008)
 Swing That Music – A Tribute to Louis Armstrong (Opening Day, 2010)
 Stars & Stripes: Canadian Brass Salute America (Opening Day 2010) with members of NEXUS
 A Very Merry Christmas (Opening Day, 2010) – with various artists
 Spirit Dance (Opening Day, 2010)
 The Classics: From Pachelbel to Purcell (Opening Day, 2011)
 The Classics: Between Bach & Handel (Opening Day, 2011)
 The Classics: Mozart & More (Opening Day, 2011)
 Brahms On Brass (Opening Day, 2011)
 Takes Flight (Opening Day, 2011)
 Schumann: Carnaval (Opening Day, 2013)
 Christmas Time Is Here: The Encore! (Opening Day, 2013)
 Great Wall of China (Opening Day, 2014)
 Perfect Landing (Opening Day, 2015)
 Canadiana (Linus, 2021)

DVD/VHS/Laser discs
 Canadian Brass Live (1986)
 The Canadian Brass Masterclass (1989)
 The Canadian Brass Spectacular (1989)
 On Stage at Wolftrap (1990)
 Home Movies - Canadian Brass - An Innovative portrait ( 1991)
 Strings, Winds, and All That Brass (1992)
 The Canadian Brass Live in Germany (1994)
 Christmas Experiment (1998)
 A Christmas Gloria (1999)
 Bootleg Canadian Brass — Authorized Version (2002)
 Three Nights with Canadian Brass (2003)
 "Live from LPR New York" (2012)

References

External links
 Official website
 Listing of Canadian Brass concerts
 Canadian Brass YouTube Channel
 

1970 establishments in Canada
Brass quintets
Canadian brass bands
Canadian classical music groups
Chamber music
CBS Records artists
Columbia Records artists
Members of the Order of Canada
Musical groups established in 1970
Musical groups from Toronto
Juno Award for Instrumental Album of the Year winners
Philips Records artists
RCA Victor artists
RCA Records artists
Vanguard Records artists